Roudnice nad Labem is a town in Litoměřice District in the Ústí nad Labem Region of the Czech Republic. It has about 13,000 inhabitants. The historic town centre is well preserved and is protected by law as an urban monument zone.

A steel road bridge dating from the early 20th century spans the Elbe in Roudnice nad Labem. Its medieval predecessor was the third oldest stone bridge in Bohemia (after Prague and Písek) and the first bridge to connect both banks of the river. Roudnice nad Labem features a castle of late Romanesque origin, now reconstructed in Baroque style.

Administrative parts
The village of Podlusky is an administrative part of Roudnice nad Labem.

Etymology
The original names Rúdnik and Rúdnica probably come from the iron water of a nearby spring (ruda = "ore").

Geography
It lies in the Lower Eger Table, in the Polabí lowlands. The town is situated on the left bank of the Elbe River, which forms the northern municipal border.

History

Roudnice nad Labem is one of the oldest Czech towns. The first written mentions of Roudnice are from 1167 and 1176, but archeological excavations in the area confirmes existence of a settlement in the prehistoric ages. The market settlement quickly became economically important thanks to its location on the so-called Lusatian road and in the 13th century, it received the town status.

In the 12th century, a Romanesque castle was built, used as the summer residence of archbishops and bishops.

In 1333, bishop Jan of Dražice ordered that a bridge be built over the Elbe. It was the first stone bridge over the Elbe and the third stone bridge in Bohemia. At the end of the 14th century, the New Town of Roudnice nad Labem (encompassing today's Jan of Dražice Square and Husovo Square) was built and, along with the Old Town of Roudnice nad Labem, surrounded by walls.

In 1421, during the Hussite Wars, Roudnice nad Labem was conquered by Jan Žižka. During Hussite invasions, the local monastery was destroyed and never renewed. After the Hussite Wars, the town was sold several times, which does not benefit its development. In 1603, it was acquired by the Lobkowicz family and it remained so until 1945. During their rule, the town was rebuilt and expanded. During the Thirty Years' War, Roudnice nad Labem was burned down and demolished by the Swedish army.

In the 19th century, Roudnice nad Labem became the industrial and economical centre of the Podřipský region, due to several new factories and the railway from Prague to Dresden. Until 1918, Roudnice – Raudnitz was part of the Austrian monarchy (after the compromise of 1867), in the district of the same name, one of the 94 Bezirkshauptmannschaften in Bohemia.

The first football match in the Austro-Hungarian Empire and in the Czech lands took place on the islet in the middle of the Elbe, located within the town limits, in 1887 (in 1892, according to some sources). In 1910, the old stone bridge was rebuilt into a new steel road bridge.

Demographics

Education
There are four high schools in Roudnice nad Labem: Gymnasium, Vocational School and Training Centre, Podřipská Private Vocational School and Training Centre, and Higher Vocational School and Secondary Vocational School, which also offers higher education. There are also six elementary schools, including one elementary art school, and one special school.

Sport
The town has a swimming pool, an ice hockey arena, and football and athletic stadiums. Roudnice airport is located near the southwestern edge of the town and hosts the Memorial Air Show every other year.

Sights

The historic centre is made up of castle complex and of squares Karlovo, Husovo, Purkyňovo and Jana z Dražic with theirs surroundings. The town hall is located on the Karlovo Square. It is a pseudo-Renaissance building from 1869.

The Watchtower is the only preserved remain of the Old Town's fortifications. It is a Gothic stone tower and it is open to the public as a lookout tower.

The church complex is formed by the Church of the Nativity of the Virgin Mary and Augustinian monastery. The monastery was built in 1333–1353. The church is a typical Czech Gothic building from the first half of the 14th century. The iron spring after which the town got its name is located there.

Roudnice Castle
Roudnice Castle was built in the 12th century by Prague bishops to protected an important trade route from Prague to Upper Lusatia along the Elbe. In the 14th and 15th centuries, it was rebuilt in the Gothic style and became a popular summer residence for Prague bishops. It is said that Jan Hus was ordained as a priest there, but it is just a fictional legend.

In 1421, the Catholic Church sold the castle to Jan Smiřický, who renovated it once again. King George of Poděbrady captured Roudnice from Smiřický in 1467. It passed into the ownership of William of Rosenberg, the Supreme Burgrave and one of the wealthiest men in Bohemia. After Rosenberg's death, his widow Polyxena Pernštejn married Zdeněk Vojtěch of Lobkowicz, Chancellor of the Czech Kingdom and later 1st Prince Lobkowicz, bringing Roudnice into the Lobkowicz family possessions.

In 1652, their son Václav Eusebius embarked upon an ambitious project to transform the castle into an early baroque palace. From 1657 until the World War II the Lobkowicz Collection's library was stored in Roudnice Castle, leading to the library being named the Roudnice Lobkowicz Library.

Václav Eusebius of Lobkowicz hired two Italian architects, Francesco Caratti and Antonio della Porta, to completely renovate Roudnice Castle. Between 1652 and 1684, they demolished most of the original structure, creating a 200-room baroque residence that included a clock tower, a chapel decorated with elaborate frescoes, a theatre, and large formal gardens. For two and a half centuries Roudnice served as a repository for the Lobkowicz family's collections of artwork, religious objects, musical instruments, and books and manuscripts.

The castle was confiscated by the Communist government in 1948; the Czechoslovak People's Army used the building for the Vít Nejedlý military music school, as well as for administrative offices. After 1989, the castle was restored to the Lobkowicz family, who continued to rent the castle to the school until it closed in 2008. In 2009 the castle underwent major renovations, and it was opened to the public.

The Castle Riding Hall was built in the 17th century by Antonio della Porta and today it houses Gallery of Modern Art.

Notable people

Cola di Rienzo (1313–1354), Italian politician, imprisoned for a time at the Roudnice castle
Abraham ben Saul Broda (c. 1640–1717), Rabbi in Roudnice
Emanuele d'Astorga (1680–1736), Italian componist
Seligmann Heller (1831–1890), Austrian poet
Max Dvořák (1874–1921), art historian
Arthur Breisky (1885–1910), writer
Georg Wilhelm Pabst (1885–1967), Austrian film director and screenwriter
Kurt Epstein (1904–1975), water polo player, survivor of holocaust
Vladimír Černík (1917–2002), tennis player
Svatopluk Beneš (1918–2007), actor
Lenka Bradáčová (born 1973), lawyer
Roman Týce (born 1977), footballer
Pavlína Ščasná (born 1982), footballer
Jana Komrsková (born 1983), artistic gymnast

Twin towns – sister cities

Roudnice nad Labem is twinned with:
 Dessau-Roßlau, Germany
 Ruelle-sur-Touvre, France

Gallery

References

External links

Roudnice nad Labem – regional tourist portal

Cities and towns in the Czech Republic
Populated places in Litoměřice District
Populated riverside places in the Czech Republic
Populated places on the Elbe
Shtetls